Jaaga Study helps young people become technology professionals through accelerated learning programs such as bootcamps, co-learning, hands-on workshops and events. The Program is about web development and mobile development learning, that started on 20 January 2013. The first batch of 20 students learnt programming skills from MOOCs.

Jaaga Study was selected as one of five global winners in the ‘Reclaim Open Learning Innovation Challenge’ that was conducted by MIT Media Lab.

References

Organisations based in Bangalore
2013 establishments in Karnataka
Organizations established in 2013